Colonial Affair (April 19, 1990 – April 23, 2013) was an American Thoroughbred racehorse. He was best known for winning the Belmont Stakes in 1993.

Background
He was sired by 1981 Kentucky Derby and Preakness Stakes winner Pleasant Colony, out of the Rutledge Farm mare Snuggle.

Purchased for $100,000 at the 1991 Fasig-Tipton Saratoga select yearling sale, Colonial Affair was raced by Centennial Farms. He was trained by the 1992 U.S. Racing Hall of Fame inductee Scotty Schulhofer

Racing career
Colonial Affair won the Belmont Stakes under jockey Julie Krone as the 13-1 longshot. His 1993 Belmont triumph is also in the record books, because it was the first time that a woman jockey won any of the three races of the Triple Crown of Thoroughbred Racing.

At age four, Colonial Affair was only three votes shy (out of a possible 247 votes) of winning the 1994 Eclipse Award for American Champion Older Dirt Male Horse (The Wicked North voted the award winner) after winning the Whitney Handicap and Jockey Club Gold Cup that year.

Colonial Affair was the favorite for the 1994 $3 million Breeders' Cup Classic until he broke a bone in his leg, thereby ending his racing career.

Retirement
Colonial Affair was originally retired in 1995 to Gainesway Farm.  He was then supposed to be sent to New Zealand in 1998 but was instead sent to Japan and stood privately at stud at Haras El Paraiso in Argentina.

Colonial Affair died in his stall on April 23, 2013, at Haras El Paraiso in Capitan Sarmiento, Argentina.  He was 23.

External links
 1993 Belmont (3:51)
 1993 Peter Pan Stakes (1:49)
 1994 Whitney Handicap (7:13)
 1994 Jockey Club Gold Cup (4:14)
 1994 Excelsior Breeders' Cup Handicap (2:17)

Pedigree

References

1990 racehorse births
2013 racehorse deaths
Racehorses bred in Virginia
Racehorses trained in the United States
Belmont Stakes winners
Thoroughbred family 13-b